Valenzana Mado is an Italian football club, based in Valenza, Piedmont. Currently it plays in Promozione Piedmont and Aosta Valley.

History

Valenzana Mado 
The club was founded in 2012 after the merger of Valenzana Calcio and G.S. Mado. It renounces to Serie D for strong financial commitment required, to start instead from Eccellenza.

Before the merger

Valenzana 

Valenzana Calcio was founded in 1906.

In the season 2011–12 after 12 seasons in Lega Pro Seconda Divisione it was relegated to Serie D.

Alberto Omodeo has been for 20 years the historic President of the club.

Mado 
G.S. Mado was founded in 2002. The club in the season 2011–12 has played in Prima Categoria Alessandria. Very numerous and important his youth sector made up of about 200 boys.

Colors and badge 
The team's colors are dark blue and red.

References

External links 

Association football clubs established in 2012
Football clubs in Piedmont and Aosta Valley
Serie C clubs
Serie D clubs
2012 establishments in Italy
Phoenix clubs (association football)